Dragon Stadium is a stadium in Southlake, Texas. It is used mostly for American football games. The stadium is Located at 1085 S. Kimball Ave. in Southlake, Texas, the stadium serves Carroll ISD, and is the home of the Carroll Senior High School Dragons football team. The stadium was used by the Major League Soccer club Dallas Burn for the 2003 season, after having used the Cotton Bowl since its founding in 1996.

The stadium was built in 2001 and the first game held at the stadium was on September 7, 2001, an American football game against the Haltom Buffalos. The final cost of the stadium was in the range of between $18 million and $19 million. The stadium shares land with the Transportation Offices for Carroll ISD. Before 2003, the stadium could seat 8,000 people. When the Dallas Burn Soccer Club terminated their lease with Carroll ISD, they left bleachers that they had assembled in the East endzone. The new capacity is approximately 11,000 people. The endzone bleachers are home to the Carroll Dragon Band and the Emerald Belle Drill Team at home games. The Press Box is accessed via elevator and has two floors. The second floor houses operations and coach booths. The first floor houses administration and scouting personnel. The playing surface is artificial and encompasses many draining features due to how easily the concourse can flood in heavy rains. In 2006, the home parking lot was doubled in size due to expected population growth. As of August 2006, the Carroll ISD school board voted to hold all future graduation ceremonies for graduating seniors of Carroll Senior High at Dragon Stadium. The decision spurred a lot of controversy due to possible weather issues and heat concerns.

In 2006, Under Armour filmed part of a popular commercial called "Click-Clack" at Dragon Stadium. One of the opening scenes shows Green Bay Packers linebacker A. J. Hawk running across the turf at Dragon Stadium.

One interesting feature of the stadium is that, if one sits on the north side, it is possible to see another local high school football stadium standing in the shadows: Mustang-Panther Stadium built in the 1970s, operated by the neighboring GCISD Grapevine-Colleyville Independent School District.

In June 2009, the Carroll ISD school board voted to issue bonds to pay for a $5 million renovation of the stadium.  This renovation enclosed both east and west endzones.

New England Patriots player Rob Gronkowski snuck into the stadium in June 2017 for a workout and posted on his social media.

References

American football venues in the Dallas–Fort Worth metroplex
High school football venues in Texas
Soccer venues in Texas
FC Dallas
Former Major League Soccer stadiums
Sports venues in the Dallas–Fort Worth metroplex
Sports venues completed in 2001
2001 establishments in Texas